The Orpheus Chamber Orchestra (founded 1972) is a classical music chamber orchestra based in New York City. They have won several Grammy Awards, and are known for their collaborative leadership style in which the musicians, not a conductor, interpret the score.

History 
The Orpheus Chamber Orchestra was founded in 1972 by Julian Fifer and a group of young musicians. With 71 albums, including the Grammy Award-winning Shadow Dances: Stravinsky Miniatures, and 42 commissioned and premiered original works, Orpheus rotates musical leadership roles for each work.

Performing without a conductor, Orpheus presents an annual series at Carnegie Hall and tours extensively to major national and international venues.

Collaborators of Orpheus include Fazıl Say, Isaac Stern, Gidon Kremer, Itzhak Perlman, Gil Shaham, Yo-Yo Ma, Mischa Maisky, Emanuel Ax, Richard Goode, Alicia de Larrocha, Radu Lupu, Martha Argerich, Alfred Brendel, Horacio Gutierrez, Murray Perahia, Peter Serkin, Mitsuko Uchida, Tatiana Troyanos, Martin Fröst, Anne Akiko Meyers, Maureen Forrester, Frederica von Stade, Peter Schreier, Anne Sofie von Otter, Dawn Upshaw, and Renée Fleming. Orpheus has premiered works by Elliott Carter, Jacob Druckman, Mario Davidovsky, Michael Gandolfi, William Bolcom, Osvaldo Golijov, Fred Lerdahl, Gunther Schuller, Ellen Taaffe Zwilich, Susan Botti, David Rakowski, Bruce Adolphe, Peter Lieberson, Elizabeth Brown, Wayne Shorter, Brad Mehldau, and Han Yong.

Individual members of Orpheus have received recognition for solo, chamber music, and orchestral performances. Of the 30 players who comprise the basic membership of Orpheus, many also hold teaching positions at conservatories and universities in the New York and New England areas, including Juilliard, Manhattan School of Music, New England Conservatory, Columbia, Yale, Mannes College of Music, Montclair State University, and the Hartt School. Orpheus musicians also hold posts with other orchestras such as the New York Philharmonic, American Composer's Orchestra, Met Opera Orchestra, New Jersey Symphony Orchestra, and New York City Ballet Orchestra. Orpheus members serve on the administrative staff as well as on the Board of Directors.

Touring 
Orpheus has embarked on many extensive tours of the United States, Europe, South America, and Asia including Japan.

Orpheus as a democratic workplace 
In March 2007, Orpheus became one of the first winners of the Worldwide Award for the Most Democratic Workplaces sponsored by WorldBlu, Inc., a Washington, D.C.-based organization specializing in organizational democracy.

Notable works

Recordings 
The Orpheus has recorded over 70 albums. Their extensive catalog for Deutsche Grammophon includes Baroque masterworks of Handel, Corelli and Vivaldi, Haydn symphonies, Mozart symphonies and serenades, the complete Mozart wind concerti with Orpheus members as soloists, Romantic works by Dvořák, Grieg and Tchaikovsky and a number of twentieth-century classics by Bartók, Prokofiev, Fauré, Ravel, Schoenberg, and others. Recent releases include a recording of English and America folk songs with countertenor Andreas Scholl (Decca); Creation, a collection the Impressionist music from 1920s Paris with saxophonist Branford Marsalis (Sony Classical); a series of recordings of Mozart's greatest piano concerti with Richard Goode (Nonesuch); and a vigorous reading of The Four Seasons with Sarah Chang (EMI Classics). A collection of Mozart piano concerti with Jonathan Biss was released in 2008, also on EMI Classics, and in 2014 Orpheus released its first self-produced album containing Beethoven Symphonies Nos. 5 & 7 recorded live at Carnegie Hall.

Commissioning
Within the past decade, Orpheus presented The New Brandenburgs program, engaging six composers to create six new works for the orchestra. Each composer was joined with one of Bach’s Brandenburg Concertos and was asked to compose a new piece inspired by the original. Following the completion of The New Brandenburgs, Orpheus launched its Project 440 initiative that commissioned four emerging composers chosen by a diverse group of advisors through a nationwide selection process. The four composers included Cynthia Wong, Clint Needham, Andrew Norman, and Alex Mincek.

References

External links

Orpheus Chamber Orchestra website
[ Orpheus AllMusic page]
Orpheus mySpace page

Musical groups established in 1972
Chamber orchestras
Grammy Award winners
Deutsche Grammophon artists
Orchestras based in New York City